Harry Norman Turtledove (born June 14, 1949) is an American author who is best known for his work in the genres of alternate history, historical fiction, fantasy, science fiction, and mystery fiction. He is a student of history and completed his PhD in Byzantine history. His dissertation was on the period AD 565–582. He lives in Southern California.

In addition to his birth name, Turtledove writes under a number of pen names: Eric Iverson, H. N. Turteltaub, Dan Chernenko, and Mark Gordian. He began publishing novels in the realm of fantasy starting in 1979 and continues to publish to the current day; his latest being  Or Even Eagle Flew (2021) about Amelia Earhart and World War II.

Early life
Turtledove was born in Los Angeles, California, on June 14, 1949 and grew up in Gardena in Southern California.  His paternal grandparents, who were Romanian Jews, had first emigrated to Winnipeg, Manitoba, before they moved to California in the United States. He was educated in local public schools during his early life.

After dropping out during his freshman year at Caltech, Turtledove attended UCLA, where he completed his undergraduate degree and received a PhD in Byzantine history in 1977. His dissertation was The Immediate Successors of Justinian: A Study of the Persian Problem and of Continuity and Change in Internal Secular Affairs in the Later Roman Empire During the Reigns of Justin II and Tiberius II Constantine (AD 565–582).

Career

Turtledove published his first two novels, Wereblood and Werenight, in 1979 under the pseudonym "Eric G. Iverson". He later explained that his editor at Belmont Tower did not think that people would believe the author's real name was "Turtledove" and came up with something more Nordic. He continued to use "Iverson" until 1985. Another early pseudonym was "Mark Gordian".

That year, he published Herbig-Haro and And So to Bed under his real name. Turtledove has recently begun publishing historical novels under the pseudonym "H. N. Turteltaub" (Turteltaube means turtle dove in German). He published three books as "Dan Chernenko" (the Scepter of Mercy series).

He has written several works in collaboration, including The Two Georges with Richard Dreyfuss, "Death in Vesunna" with his first wife, Betty Turtledove (pen name: Elaine O'Byrne); Household Gods with Judith Tarr; and others with Susan Shwartz, S. M. Stirling, and Kevin R. Sandes.

Turtledove won the Homer Award for Short Story in 1990 for "Designated Hitter", the John Esten Cooke Award for Southern Fiction in 1993 for The Guns of the South, and the Hugo Award for Novella in 1994 for "Down in the Bottomlands". Must and Shall was nominated for the 1996 Hugo Award and Nebula Award for Best Novelette and received an honorable mention for the 1995 Sidewise Award for Alternate History. The Two Georges also received an honorable mention for the 1995 Sidewise Award for Alternate History.

His Worldwar series received a Sidewise Award for Alternate History Honorable Mention in 1996. In 1998, his novel How Few Remain won the Sidewise Award for Alternate History. He won his second Sidewise Award in 2003 for his novel Ruled Britannia. He won his third Sidewise Award for his short story "Zigeuner” and his fourth for his short story "Christmas Truce".

On August 1, 1998, Turtledove was named honorary Kentucky Colonel as guest of honor at Rivercon XXIII in Louisville, Kentucky. His The Gladiator was the cowinner of the 2008 Prometheus Award.

Turtledove served as the toastmaster for Chicon 2000, the 58th World Science Fiction Convention.

He is married to the mystery and science fiction writer Laura Frankos. His brother-in-law is the fantasy author Steven Frankos.

Publishers Weekly dubbed Turtledove "The Master of Alternate History". Within the genre, he is known for creating original alternate history scenarios, such as survival of the Byzantine Empire or an alien invasion during the middle of the Second World War. In addition, he has been credited with giving original treatment to alternate themes that had been dealt with by many others, such as the victory of the South in the American Civil War or the victory of Nazi Germany during the Second World War. His novels have been credited with bringing alternate history into the mainstream.

Bibliography

References

External links 

 Fantastic Fiction Author Page
 MacMillan Publisher's Harry Turtledove page 
 
 National Review Online audio interview with Harry Turtledove
 

1949 births
Living people
 
American alternate history writers
American Byzantinists
American fantasy writers
American historical novelists
American science fiction writers
Jewish American novelists
Writers from California
Conan the Barbarian novelists
Hugo Award-winning writers
American people of Romanian-Jewish descent
Sidewise Award winners
University of California, Los Angeles alumni
California Institute of Technology alumni
20th-century American novelists
21st-century American novelists
American male novelists
21st-century American non-fiction writers
American male non-fiction writers
20th-century American male writers
21st-century American male writers
20th-century pseudonymous writers
21st-century pseudonymous writers